The Madagascar mannikin (Lepidopygia nana) is a common species of estrildid finch native to Madagascar. It has an estimated global extent of occurrence of 100,000 to 1,000,000 km2. Other names for this species include Madagascar munia, bibfinch, African bibfinch, African parsonfinch, and dwarf mannikin.

It is found in subtropical and tropical dry forest, grassland, shrubland and even artificial landscapes. The status of the species is evaluated as Least Concern.

References

BirdLife Species Factsheet

Estrildidae
Endemic birds of Madagascar
Birds described in 1845
Taxa named by Jacques Pucheran